Dice is an unincorporated community located in Perry County, Kentucky, United States.

The origin of the name "Dice" is obscure. It may be based on a surname originating in England.

References

Unincorporated communities in Perry County, Kentucky
Unincorporated communities in Kentucky